The 2000 Japanese motorcycle Grand Prix was the third round of the 2000 Grand Prix motorcycle racing season. It took place on 9 April 2000 at the Suzuka Circuit.

500 cc classification

250 cc classification

125 cc classification

Championship standings after the race (500cc)

Below are the standings for the top five riders and constructors after round three has concluded. 

Riders' Championship standings

Constructors' Championship standings

 Note: Only the top five positions are included for both sets of standings.

References

Japanese motorcycle Grand Prix
Japanese
Motorcycle Grand Prix
Japanese motorcycle Grand Prix